The 1978–79 Texas Tech Red Raiders men's basketball team represented Texas Tech University in the Southwest Conference during the 1978–79 NCAA Division I men's basketball season. The head coach was Gerald Myers, his 9th year with the team. The Red Raiders played their home games in the Lubbock Municipal Coliseum in Lubbock, Texas.

References

Texas Tech Red Raiders basketball seasons
Texas Tech
Texas Tech